Parry Aftab is an Internet privacy and security lawyer, considered one of the founders of cyberlaw and founder of the world's largest and oldest cybersafety charity. Named by The Boston Herald as "the leading expert in cybercrime in the world," Aftab wrote the first cybersafety book in the world for parents (in 1996) and has received a long list of honors and has been appointed to the boards of directors and advisory boards of several companies, including TRUSTe, Facebook, MTV and Sesame Street Online. She is a longtime Internet safety expert who founded the Internet safety organization WiredSafety, StopCyberbullying and the consulting firm, WiredTrust. She was "the Privacy Lawyer" columnist for Information Week Magazine for many years. In 2016 Parry Aftab founded Cybersafety India and the StopCyberbullying and sextortion and morphing prevention initiatives for India. She resides in both the US and Canada.

Career
Aftab was appointed by UNESCO's Director General Federico Mayor as the chief of the U.S. National Action Committee for UNESCO's World Citizen's Committee on Protecting Innocence in Danger group in 1999 to address online sexual exploitation of children.  She became a member of the Board of Directors for the non-profit, TRUSTe in 2003. In 2005, the United States Congress issued a resolution that recognized her efforts to combat cyberbullying as Executive Director of StopCyberbullying and WiredSafety.

Her organization, WiredSafety, became a member of Facebook's Safety Advisory Board in 2009 and in April, Aftab appeared on Good Morning America for its town hall meeting on sexting. In 2010 she received the FBI Director's Community Leadership Award and was one of 28 members in the Online Safety and Technology Working Group of the National Telecommunications and Information Administration. She was one of 29 members of the Internet Safety Technical Task Force, run by Harvard's Berkman Center.

She was the co-recipient of the RCMP's Child Recovery Award in 2011. Aftab was the organizer for a 2015 anti-cyberbullying event in Ireland, and has been a member of the advisory boards for MTV's A Thin Line, Fair Play, Sesame Street Online and the Ad Council. Her clients have included Facebook, Disney and Nickelodeon.

Reception
Members of radical internet groups who disagree with her anti-cyberbullying campaigns have "launched a massive Internet harassment campaign" against her. In 2010, she was forced to cancel a Good Morning America appearance (where she would be discussing the cyberbullying campaign against Jessi Slaughter by members of 4chan's /b/ board) due to targeted harassment, which included Google bombing baseless accusations of child molestation against Aftab. In July 2011 her detractors incited a swatting incident at her home when they contacted police claiming her house was the site of murders and hostages. Aftab was on vacation at the time and a local police swat team investigated the false claims.

According to the British blogger Katie Jones, Aftab tried to coerce her into releasing control of the domain, Katie.com, which was also the name of a newly published book, Katie.com: My Story. Jones refused and wrote about the incident on her website.

Publications
Child Abuse on the Internet. Ending the Silence, Carlos A. Arnaldo, Ed., Chapter 21: "The Technical Response: Blocking, Filtering and Rating the Internet", pp. 135–140 (2001)  
Inocencia en Peligro : Conviva con sus Hijos y Protéjalos Cuando Naveguen por Internet (2001)  
The Parent's Guide to Protecting Your Children in Cyberspace (1999)  
Parents Guide to the Internet: And How to Protect Your Children in Cyberspace (1997)  
Parent's Guide to the Internet - UK edition (2000)  
Ciberbullying, Guia Practica - Spain/Espana (2004)  
INTERNET con los menores riesgos. Guía práctica para madres y padres - Spain/Espana (2003)

References

External links

 Aftab's web site

1961 births
American activists
American lawyers
Computer law activists
Computer law scholars
Cyberbullying
Living people
American non-fiction writers
American writers of Iranian descent